Carbonita  is an extinct genus of nonmarine ostracod crustaceans that lived during the Carboniferous period.

Species
The genus contains four species:
Carbonita evelinae (Jones, 1870)
Carbonita pungens (Jones & Kirkby, 1867)
Carbonita ovata Retrum & Kaesler, 2005
Carbonita triangulata Retrum & Kaesler, 2005

References

Carboniferous Ostracoda, the Genus Carbonita Strand. FW Anderson, 1970
 Quantitative analysis of dimorphism in Carbonita humilis (Jones and Kirkby). MJM Bless, JE Pollard, American Bulletin of Paleontology, 1975

Prehistoric ostracod genera
Podocopida genera
Carbonitidae
Carboniferous crustaceans
Fossils of Russia
Fossils of the United States